José Miguel Fernández de Liencres (19 October 1898 – 8 January 1975) was a Spanish tennis player. He competed in the men's singles and doubles events at the 1920 Summer Olympics.

References

External links
 

1898 births
1975 deaths
Spanish male tennis players
Olympic tennis players of Spain
Tennis players at the 1920 Summer Olympics
Tennis players from Madrid